This article summarizes the events, album releases and album release dates in hip hop music for the year 2010.

Events

January
Producer Shawty Redd was arrested on a murder charge.

February
Game signs a new record contract and returns to Aftermath Entertainment.
Nujabes died on February 26, aged 36, in a traffic accident.

March
Lil Wayne begins his one-year prison term. He shot over 30 music videos before his term.
Ludacris becomes the first rapper in 2010 to be featured on 3 top 10 Billboard Hot 100 charted songs. (Justin Bieber's "Baby", Taio Cruz's "Break Your Heart", and "How Low")
T.I. is officially released from prison and begins work on his seventh album.
Lloyd Banks releases info via his Twitter that his new album will be called 'Hunger For More 2' and will attempt to take him back to his best work. However, the G-Unit label responded later that day stating that the title is tentative and not set in concrete.
Ludacris' seventh studio album Battle of the Sexes becomes the first hip hop album of 2010 to debut at No. 1 on the Billboard 200.
O.S.T.R.'s album Tylko dla dorosłych becomes the first hip hop album of 2010 to reach No. 1 on the OLiS.

April
Dr. Dre announces the first single off his much anticipated Detox album. The track features Jay-Z.
Lil Wayne's album Rebirth reaches gold, with 505,000 copies sold after two months of release.
Eminem's album Relapse 2 is renamed to Recovery and confirmed to be released June 22, 2010.
Guru died on April 19, aged 48, from multiple myeloma.
50 Cent announced The Invitation Tour to promote Black Magic and Before I Self Destruct.
B.o.B's track "Nothin' on You" becomes the first Hip Hop song of the year to hit number one on the Hot 100. The single was also certified platinum.

May 
B.o.B becomes the second Hip Hop act to top the Billboard 200 in 2010 with his album B.o.B Presents: The Adventures of Bobby Ray. It sold 85,000 copies in its first week.
Gucci Mane is released from prison after spending 6 months behind bars for violating his probation. He announced that he has made a new label called 1017 Brick Squad Records and pushed back release date of his third album, The State vs. Radric Davis: The Appeal to a later date.
Eminem's single "Not Afraid" debuts at number one on the Billboard Hot 100 becoming the first hip hop track to do so in 2010 and second hip hop song in history to debut at #1.
Young Money's group album We Are Young Money was certified Gold.

June 
Ludacris' single "My Chick Bad" is RIAA certified Platinum.
DJ Khaled's single All I Do Is Win is RIAA certified Gold.
 Ludacris' album Battle of the Sexes becomes the second hip hop album released in 2010 to be certified Gold.
 Lil Boosie is indicted on murder charges.
 DonGuralesko's album Totem Leśnych Ludzi becomes the second hip hop album of 2010 to reach No. 1 on the OLiS.
 Fat Joe and his entourage are questioned for sexual assault in Wisconsin.
 Drake's debut album Thank Me Later sold about 449,000 copies in its first week giving it a No. 1 debut on the Billboard 200.
 Eminem's new album Recovery debuts at No. 1 on the Billboard 200 and sold more copies than any album in one week during 2010.
 Hip Hop Pioneer Rammellzee died on June 29.
 Lil Wayne's single "Drop the World" is certified Platinum.
 Kid Cudi was arrested in Manhattan, New York and charged with felony criminal mischief and possession of a controlled substance. Despite his arrest, he was released and made it to Manchester, Tennessee in time to headline the Bonnaroo fest.

July 
 The rumored track list for Kanye West's "Good Ass Job" leaks.
 Eminem's album Recovery passes 1,000,000 copies sold in its second week.
 Eldo's album Zapiski z 1001 Nocy becomes the third hip hop album of 2010 to reach No. 1 on the OLiS.
 It was officially announced that pending good behavior, rapper Lil Wayne will be released from prison on November 4, 2010
 Eminem's single Love the Way You Lie tops the Billboard Hot 100, making it Eminem's fourth overall No. 1 single.

August 
 Drake hosted the first annual  Ovo (October's Very Own) Festival which included the VIP list of rap stars including: Jay-Z, Eminem, Rick Ross, Young Jeezy, Bun B and Fabolous.
 The music videos for Kanye West's hit single Power and Eminem's hit single Love the Way You Lie debut the same day on MTV.
DJ Khaled's single All I Do Is Win is RIAA certified Platinum.
 Kanye West's and Nicki Minaj's upcoming studio albums are titles are revealed to be "Dark Twisted Fantasy" and "Pink Friday" respectively.
 Hip-Hop's Cash Kings 2010 list comes out August 17, 2010. Jay-Z ($63 Million), Diddy ($30 Million), & Akon ($21 Million) come on as the Hip-Hop Cash Kings in 2010. The rest follow as Lil Wayne ($20 Million), Dr. Dre ($17 Million), Ludacris ($16 Million), Snoop Dogg ($15 Million), Timbaland ($14 Million), Pharrell Williams ($13 Million), Drake ($10 Million), T.I. ($9 Million), Swizz Beatz ($9 Million), Eminem ($8 Million), 50 Cent ($8 Million).
 DJ Khaled signs a record contract with Cash Money Records and Bizzy Bone says he may sign also.
 Eminem Recovery sold 2,000,000 copies in two months.

October
 On October 13, Harlem World member Huddy 6 was killed in a car accident at the George Washington Bridge in New York, aged 34.
 T.I.'s pending drug charges were dropped, but due to a violation of his parole, he was sentenced to 11 months in FCC Forrest City, the prison facility where he previously served time for weapons-possession charges. These recent events likely caused him to change his upcoming album's title from "King Uncaged" to "No Mercy".

November
 Lil Wayne is released from prison
 Dr. Dre releases the first official single off Detox titled "Kush" which features Snoop Dogg and Akon. The song has peaked within the top 50 on the Billboard Hot 100.
 After 58 weeks on the charts, in November 2010, Kid Cudi's debut album Man on the Moon: The End of Day was certified Gold for selling over 500,000 copies in the United States by the Recording Industry Association of America (RIAA),
 Atlanta, Georgia rapper Waka Flocka Flame received his first gold plaque for the single "No Hands" produced by Memphis, Tennessee's Drumma Boy, off his debut album Flockaveli.

December
Pittsburgh, Pennsylvania rapper Sam Willis's single "Peso" is certified Gold.
Following an arrest for a probation violation, DMX was sentenced to a year in prison in Arizona.
Lil Wayne released his first single since being released from jail called "6 Foot 7 Foot".  The single will be the first single off Tha Carter IV.
Former Bad Boy artist G. Dep confesses to police regarding a cold case murder he committed in 1993, reportedly due to a want of "making amends" with his past.
Former Cash Money Records hip hop artist Magnolia Shorty shot and killed in a homicide murder on December 20.

Released albums

Highest-charting singles

Highest first week sales
As of December 31, 2010.

Highest critically reviewed albums (Metacritic)

See also
Previous article: 2009 in hip hop music
Next article: 2011 in hip hop music

References 

2010s in hip hop music
Hip hop
Hip hop music by year